Aley is a city in Lebanon.

Aley may also refer to:

Places
Aley, Somerset, a village in England, United Kingdom
Aley, Texas, a village in Texas, United States
Aley District, a district in Mount Lebanon, Lebanon
Aley (river), a river in Russia

People with the surname
Sarah Aley (born 1984), Australian cricketer
Zac Aley (born 1991), English footballer